Vitor Ramil (born April 7, 1962, Pelotas, Rio Grande do Sul) is a musician, singer, composer and writer from Brazil.

Discography 
Estrela, Estrela (1981)
A Paixão de V Segundo Ele Próprio (1984)
Tango (1987) – re-edited in CD on 1996
À Beça (1996)
Ramilonga – A Estética do Frio (1997)
Tambong (1998)
Longes (2004)
Satolep Sambatown (2007) with Marcos Suzano
Délibáb (2010)
Foi no Mês que Vem (2013)
Campos Neutrais (2017)
Avenida Angélica (2022) (CD e DVD)

Writing works
Pequod (1999) – available in electronic format (in Portuguese)
A Estética do Frio (2004)
Satolep (2010)

Satolep
"Satolep" is an anagram for Pelotas, city where the artist was born. In his book "A Estetica do Frio", the author mentions that Satolep is his idealization of his hometown. He uses the word in several songs and writing works.

References

External links
Vitor Ramil joins the Crowdfunding (in Portuguese)
Official site of Vitor Ramil

Lyrics
Ciphers

1962 births
Living people
Brazilian male singer-songwriters
Brazilian singer-songwriters
Brazilian writers
People from Pelotas